Santiago Amigorena (born 15 February 1962 in Buenos Aires, Argentina) is an Argentine screenwriter, film producer, film director and writer. 

In 2007, he was nominated at the Mar del Plata Film Festival for Best Film with A Few Days in September.

Family and personal life 
In 2003, he married actress Julie Gayet, but they divorced in 2006. 

Between 2005 and 2009, he lived with French actress Juliette Binoche.

Literary work 
 Une enfance laconique (1998), P.O.L
 Une jeunesse aphone : les premiers arrangements (2000), P.O.L
 Une adolescence taciturne : le second exil (2002), P.O.L
 Le Premier Amour (2004), P.O.L
 1978 (2009), P.O.L
 La Première Défaite (2012), P.O.L
 Des jours que je n'ai pas oubliés (2014), P.O.L
 Mes derniers mots (2015), P.O.L
 Les Premières Fois (2016), P.O.L
 Le Ghetto intérieur (2019), P.O.L
 Winner of the "Prix des libraires de Nancy"" - Le Point, 201911
 Folio Booksellers' Prize, 2021
 Selected for the Prix Goncourt, Prix Renaudot, Prix Médicis 2019
 Il y a un seul amour (2020), Stock
 Le Premier Exil (2021), P.O.L
 Selected for the Prix Médicis, 2021

Filmography 
 As director and screenwriter
 A few days in September (2006)
 Another Silence (2011)
 Les enfants rouges (2014)

 As a screenwriter
 La Jalousie, by Christophe Loizillon (1989)
 Jean Galmot, adventurer, by Alain Maline (1990)
 Maigret et la maison du juge (TV movie), by Bertrand Van Effenterre (1992)
 Les gens normaux n'ont rien d'exceptionnel, by Laurence Ferreira Barbosa (1993)
 Maigret et les caves du Majestic (TV movie), by Claude Goretta (1993)
 Le Fils du requin, by Agnès Merlet (1993)
 Le Péril jeune, by Cédric Klapisch (1994)
 Quand les étoiles rencontrent la mer, by Raymond Rajaonarivelo (1996)
 Kini and Adams, by Idrissa Ouedraogo (1997)
 Le Silence de Rak, by Christophe Loizillon (1997)
 After sex, by Brigitte Roüan (1997)
 La voie est libre, by Stéphane Clavier (1998)
 Tokyo Eyes, by Jean-Pierre Limosin (1998)
 La révolution sexuelle n'a pas eu lieu, by Judith Cahen (1999)
 Rien à faire, by Marion Vernoux (1999)
 Peut-être, by Cédric Klapisch (1999)
 Regarde-moi (en face), by Marco Nicoletti (2000)
 Bon plan, by Jérôme Lévy (2000)
 Tu ne marcheas jamais seul, by Gilles Chevallier (2001)
 Ma caméra et moi, by Christophe Loizillon (2002)
 The Wolf of the West Coast, by Hugo Santiago (2002)
 Not for, or Against, by Cédric Klapisch (2002)
 Upside Down, by Juan Diego Solanas (2012)
 Ce qui nous lie, by Cédric Klapisch (2017)
 Si tu voyais son coeur, by Joan Chemla (2017)
 Someone, Somewhere,  by Cédric Klapisch (2019)
 Gloomy Eyes by Fernando Maldonado & Jorge Tereso (2019)
 Last Words by Jonathan Nossiter based on Santiago Amigorena's book "Mes derniers mots" (2020)
 Rise by Cédric Klapisch (2022)

References

External links

1962 births
Living people
Argentine screenwriters
Argentine male writers
Argentine film producers
Argentine film directors
Argentine male film actors
Male screenwriters
Argentine writers in French
Male actors from Buenos Aires
20th-century Argentine male actors
Writers from Buenos Aires
People from Buenos Aires
Argentine people of Basque descent